Taranis is the Celtic god of thunder.

Taranis may also refer to:

BAE Systems Taranis, a British unmanned aerial vehicle
Taranis (gastropod), a genus of sea snail
5370 Taranis, an Amor asteroid
TARANIS, a satellite mission for study of upper atmospheric lightning phenomena; failed to reach orbit in 2020
Taranis, a character in British sitcom Chelmsford 123
Taranis, an orchestral composition by Fabian Müller
Taranis, codename for release 4.0 of the Trisquel Linux operating system
Taranis Books, an imprint of the Scottish West Coast Magazine
Taranis Patera, a crater on Jupiter's moon Io

See also
Taranes
Tarani
Taran (disambiguation)
Tarana (disambiguation)
Tanarus (disambiguation)
Tyrannus (disambiguation)